The eCampus University, often simply abbreviated as "Uniecampus" is a private accredited online university founded in 2006 in Novedrate, Italy.

The university was promoted by the "eCampus Foundation for universities and research", by Francesco Polidori, founder of the for-profit franchise chain CEPU (European centre for university preparation). Due to aggressive advertising, the Italian Data Protection Authority ordered the university to cease the abusive telemarketing practices in 2015.

See also 
 List of Italian universities
 Novedrate
 Distance education

References

External links 
 eCampus University Website (Homepage) (in Italian)

Private universities and colleges in Italy
Distance education institutions based in Italy
Educational institutions established in 2006
2006 establishments in Italy